Senna obtusifolia, known by the common names Chinese senna, American sicklepod, sicklepod, etc., is a plant in the genus Senna, sometimes separated in the monotypic genus Diallobus. It grows wild in North, Central, and South America, Asia, Africa, and Oceania, and is considered a particularly serious weed in many places. It has a long-standing history of confusion with Senna tora and that taxon in many sources actually refers to the present species.

In the traditional medicine of Eastern Asia, the seeds are called  in Chinese, gyeolmyeongja in Korean, and ketsumeishi in Japanese.

The green leaves of the plant are fermented to produce a high-protein food product called "kawal" which is eaten by many people in Sudan as a meat substitute. Its leaves, seeds, and root are also used in folk medicine, primarily in Asia. It is believed to possess a laxative effect, as well as to be beneficial for the eyes. As a folk remedy, the seeds are often roasted, then boiled in water to produce a tea. The plant's seeds are a commercial source of cassia gum, a food additive usually used as a thickener and named for the Chinese Senna's former placement in the genus Cassia. Roasted and ground, the seeds have also been used as a substitute for coffee. In vitro cultures of S. obtusifolia such as hairy roots may be a source of valuable secondary metabolites with medical applications.

Names, taxonomy and identifier 

S. obtusifolia is known by a number of common names. Apart from "sicklepod", sickle-pod senna, rarely "Chinese senna" or even "American sicklepod", it is also called arsenic weed, foetid cassia, or wild senna.

It is also known locally by common names such as "coffee weed" (coffeeweed) or "java bean" (in Australia) or "coffee pod" (in the American South or West), although the terms "coffee weed" or "coffee pod" are ambiguous as they also apply to S. tora. It may be called by the Hindi name "chakunda" in India, but this is also one of the names for S. tora.

The scientific name means "blunt-leaved senna", with obtusifolia coming from Latin obtusus ("dull", "blunt") + folium ("leaf").

Names in its native range are also:
 Chinese: pinyin: , though this could loosely apply to seeds of the Senna genus generally.
 Japanese:  ("Ebisu grass": エビスグサ; 胡草; 恵比須草)
 Korean:  
 Vietnamese:  (from Hán tự: 決明子)
 Portuguese:  (also used for Senna macranthera and others) 
 Hindi:

Synonyms 

Chinese senna has been treated under a wide range of scientific names. Some are synonyms of Senna obtusifolia, others are names that have been applied to it in error. In addition, several of these names may also refer to related plants. In particular, the distinction between this species and Senna tora was fraught with errors and misunderstandings:
 Cassia humilis Collad.
Cassia humilis Steud. is a synonym of Chamaecrista kunthiana
Cassia numilis Collad. is apparently a misprint and refers to Senna tora
 Cassia obtusifolia L.
 Cassia tora auct. non L.
Cassia tora L. is a synonym of Senna tora
 Cassia tora L. var. b Wight & Arn.
 Cassia tora L. var. humilis (Collad.) Collad.
 Cassia tora L. var. obtusifolia (L.) Haines
 Cassia toroides Raf.
 Cassia toroides Roxb.
 Diallobus falcatus Raf.
 Diallobus uniflorus Raf.
 Senna toroides Roxb.

Traditional Eastern medicine 
The medicinal seeds are also known by the equivalent Korean name gyeolmyeongja in traditional Korean medicine, and by the Japanese name  in kampō medicine.

The jue ming zi is used widely in Asia, including Southeast Asian countries such as Thailand, and its herbal tea is drunk instead of regular tea as a preventative for hypertension. It is also purported to have the ability to clear the eye. In Korea also, medicinal gyeolmyeongja is usually prepared as tea (gyeolmyeongja-cha. ‘sickle pod tea’).

Senna tora (Cassia tora) is used similarly, and though distinguished in the Chinese market as the "little/lesser" variety or shao jue ming ) the Japanese government's [pharmacopoeia] (Nihon yakkyokuhō) officially acknowledges both  S. obtusifolia and S. tora to be commerced as ketsumeishi.

The Japanese beverage , as the name suggests, was originally brewed from the seeds of the habusō or S. occidentalis, but currently marketed habu-cha uses S. obtusifolia as substitute, since it is a higher-yielding crop.

Meat substitute 
Kawal, a protein-rich meat substitute eaten in Sudan, is produced by crushing the leaves of the plant into a paste which is then traditionally fermented in an earthenware jar, buried in a cool place. The jar is dug up every three days and the contents mixed. After two weeks, the paste is removed and rolled into balls which are left to dry in the sun. They are usually cooked in stews with onions and okra.

See also 
 Sicklepod tea
 Chamaecrista nomame - Chamaecrista sp. (Japanese: kawaraketsumei lit. ‘riverside sicklepod’)

References

Bibliography 

 International Legume Database & Information Service (ILDIS) (2005): Genera Cassia and Senna. Version 10.01, November 2005. Retrieved 2007-12-17.

External links 

 Cassia Seed page from ENaturalHealthCenter.com site
 Photos from Missouriplants.com site

obtusifolia
Flora of North America
Flora of South America
Dietary supplements
Medicinal plants
Herbs
Plants described in 1753
Taxa named by Carl Linnaeus